Streptomyces scopuliridis is a bacterium species from the genus of Streptomyces which has been isolated from woodland soil from Rainbow Bluff in Lynn in Alabama in the United States. Streptomyces scopuliridis produces bacteriocins, desotamides B, desotamides C, desotamides D, sesquiterpenoids and herbicidins.

See also 
 List of Streptomyces species

References

Further reading

External links
Type strain of Streptomyces scopuliridis at BacDive -  the Bacterial Diversity Metadatabase

scopuliridis
Bacteria described in 2011